Pamela Damoff  (born March 13) is a Canadian Liberal politician, who was elected to represent the riding of Oakville North—Burlington in the House of Commons of Canada in the 2015 federal election.

Personal history
Born in London, Ontario, her father was vice-president of a manufacturing company and her mother was a homemaker. Damoff attended the University of Western Ontario, graduating with a Bachelor of Arts degree in 1980. She spent 27 years working in financial and investment banking positions and the last 11 year as a self-employed consultant, while she focused on the community. Damoff has lived in Oakville since 1992.

Political career 
Damoff was elected to the Oakville Town Council representing Ward 2 in 2010, and re-elected in 2014. During her time on council, she served on the Oakville Public Library Board, the budget committee and the Oakville Tourism Partnership. She was recognized as an advocate for active transportation and better cycling infrastructure in Oakville. Damoff is the chair of Oakville's Terry Fox Run and was the chair of the Oakville Santa Claus Parade.

Oakville Ward 6 councilor Max Khan was the initial Liberal Party candidate for Oakville North—Burlington in the 2015 federal election, but he died suddenly in March 2015, leaving a need to nominate a new candidate. Damoff announced her candidacy for the nomination on April 29, 2015, with the support of Khan's father. She subsequently secured the nomination, and narrowly won the following general election.

Damoff was named vice-chair of the Standing Committee on the Status of Women in December 2015. In April 2019, she fainted at her desk in the House of Commons during question period.

She was re-elected in the 2019 election. Shortly after, she was appointed Parliamentary Secretary to the Minister of Indigenous Services, Marc Miller.

Electoral record

References

External links
 Official website

1971 births
Living people
Women members of the House of Commons of Canada
Liberal Party of Canada MPs
Members of the House of Commons of Canada from Ontario
Ontario municipal councillors
People from Oakville, Ontario
University of Western Ontario alumni
Women in Ontario politics
Women municipal councillors in Canada
21st-century Canadian politicians
21st-century Canadian women politicians
Place of birth missing (living people)